A yacht is a boat and also a sailing class (sailing yacht).

The term Yacht may also refer to:

 Yacht (band), an American band
 Yachts (band), a British band
 Yacht (dice game), a dice game